A white dragon is a symbol associated in Welsh mythology with the Anglo-Saxons.

White Dragon or The White Dragon may also refer to:

Russel "White Dragon" Turner, a character in the New Zealand soap opera Shortland Street
White Dragon (comics), one of three characters in Marvel Comics
White Dragon (August Smith), a DC comics supervillain
White dragon (Dungeons & Dragons), a type of dragon in the Dungeons & Dragons roleplaying game
The White Dragon (film), a 2004 Hong Kong wuxia comedy film directed by Wilson Yip
White Dragon Horse, a white dragon that turned into a steed in the novel Journey to the West
The White Dragon (novel), a science fiction novel by American-Irish author Anne McCaffrey
White Dragon, alternate title for Strangers (2018 TV series), a British crime drama

Places

Bạch Long Vĩ island, also called the "White Dragon Tail"
White Dragon Park and White Dragon Lake, in Nanning, China
White Dragon River, a river in Gansu and Sichuan, China

See also